Gerrinae is a subfamily of water strider.

Tribes and selected Genera
 Gerrini
 Aquarius
 Gerris
 Gigantometra
 Limnogonus
 Limnoporus
 Neogerris
 Tenagogonus
 Tachygerrini
 Tachygerris

References

 
Gerridae